South Bedfordshire was a non-metropolitan district in Bedfordshire, England. It was abolished on 1 April 2009 and replaced by Central Bedfordshire.

Political control
Since the first election to the council in 1973 political control of the council has been held by the following parties:

Leadership
The last leader of the council was Norman Costin, a Conservative.

Council elections
1973 South Bedfordshire District Council election
1976 South Bedfordshire District Council election (New ward boundaries)
1979 South Bedfordshire District Council election
1980 South Bedfordshire District Council election
1982 South Bedfordshire District Council election
1983 South Bedfordshire District Council election
1984 South Bedfordshire District Council election
1986 South Bedfordshire District Council election (District boundary changes took place but the number of seats remained the same)
1987 South Bedfordshire District Council election
1988 South Bedfordshire District Council election
1990 South Bedfordshire District Council election
1991 South Bedfordshire District Council election (District boundary changes took place but the number of seats remained the same)
1992 South Bedfordshire District Council election
1994 South Bedfordshire District Council election
1995 South Bedfordshire District Council election
1996 South Bedfordshire District Council election
1998 South Bedfordshire District Council election
1999 South Bedfordshire District Council election
2000 South Bedfordshire District Council election
2002 South Bedfordshire District Council election (New ward boundaries)
2003 South Bedfordshire District Council election
2004 South Bedfordshire District Council election
2006 South Bedfordshire District Council election
2007 South Bedfordshire District Council election

District result maps

By-election results

References

External links

 
Council elections in Bedfordshire
District council elections in England